Bahar Movahed Bashiri is a board certified orthodontist, renown cartoonist and Persian classical vocalist.

Biography 
Bahar was raised in an environment which harmonized art and science; Her father is a nationally recognized surgeon and her mother is a well-known artist in Iran. Bahar was born in Tehran, Iran and started learning music as a young child first on the piano. Later on, she learned how to play the Tanbour through lessons with Maestro Seyed Amrollah Shah Ebrahimi. She quickly developed an interest for Kurdish lyrics and classical Persian vocal radifs. Simultaneously she learned to play Tar with Keyvan Saket and Mohamad Reza Ebrahimi and began intense vocal training in 1998 with the acclaimed classical Iranian singer Mrs. Parissa. During this period, Bahar was a dedicated dental student and went on to earn her DDS degree in Iran in 2003 from Tehran Azad School of Dentistry. While practicing as a dentist, she continued studying vocals with renowned Iranian vocalists Shahram Nazeri and Hamid Reza Noorbakhsh, and eventually the legendary Mohammad Reza Shajarian. In her free time, she taught at a number of music institutes and recorded her own music before she left Iran.
In 2010, Bahar immigrated to the United States to further her education and pursue professional opportunities. Since women in Iran are only allowed to perform and produce music as “co-singing” vocalists to mask their own voice, Bahar was eager to present her art in the US as a solo vocalist. In 2012, she released her debut album in collaboration with Maestro Ali Akbar Moradi, a well-known Iranian-Kurdish tanbour virtuoso. This album “Goblet of Eternal Light” was published by Traditional Crossroads and US media deemed it “one of the most hauntingly beautiful albums of the year in any style of music”. To date, Bahar has held multiple sold-out concerts across the US.

Bahar continued her dental education in the US and earned her second DDS degree from the University of California, San Francisco. Soon after, she gained a specialty in Orthodontics and a MS in Kinesiology at the Arizona School of Dentistry and Oral Health. Bahar is currently practicing orthodontics in Southern California. While her career as an orthodontist brings her joy, her endless passion for Persian classical singing cannot be quenched. Her well-rounded background has given her media recognition as a “Renaissance Woman.”

Caricature exhibitions 

 International Caricature Exhibition, Piracicaba, Brazil, 2008n and 2011	
 Golden Smile International Annual Cartoon Exhibition, Serbia, 2006
 FCW International Cartoon and Animation Festival, China, 2005
 International IACC Cartoon Festival, China, 2004
 Exhibition at Stoa, the Cultural Centre of Eastern Helsinki, Finland, 2004	
 Tolentino International Cartoon Festival, Italy, 1999 and 2003	
 Solo Exhibition at Iran House of Cartoon, Tehran, Iran, 2000

Awards 
'

 First Prize and Gold medal, 5th International FCW Cartoon Festival, China, 2005	
 Special Prize, 1st International IACC Animation & Cartoon Festival, China, 2004	
 Honorary Diploma and Special Medal, 22nd Tolentino International Caricature Festival, Italy, 2003

Music Albums 

 “Goblet of Eternal Light”, Published by Traditional Crossroads, New York, 2012	
 “Sarkhaneh”, Composition in the Ancient Iranian Music Styles, Published by Mahoor Institute of Culture and Art, Iran, 2010	
 Motion picture score “Mando”, 2009 	
 The piece “Moses & the Shepherd”, With Ukraine National Orchestra accompanying, Conductor: Vladimir Sirenko, 2007	
 Motion picture score “Among the Clouds”, 2007
 Motion picture score “Bare-foot in Paradise”, 2006

Concerts 

 “Neishapur Nights”, Town Hall Seattle, May 2017
 “Iran Through centuries”,  Town Hall Seattle, March 2015
 "The art of Persian ballad from past to present", Berkeley City College Auditorium, Berkeley, May 2013
 “World Music Institute Concert”, Leonard Nimoy Symphony Space, Broadway (New York), April 2013
 The Concert of “Nowruz”, Museum of Fine Arts, Boston,  March 2012
 The Concert of “Goriz” (Escape), Farhangsaraye honar (Tehran), September 2007

Dental Publications

Translated to Persian  
 “Medical Emergencies in the Dental office”, 6th Edition, (Stanley F. Malamed), Shayan Nemoodar Publishing House, 2009
 “Medical Emergencies in the Dental office”, 5th Edition, (Stanley F. Malamed), Shayan Nemoodar Publishing House, 2006
 “Essential Handbook of Local Anesthesia”, A translation and summary of “Handbook of Local Anesthesia”, 5th Edition, (Stanley F. Malamed), Shayan Nemoodar Publishing House, 2004

References

female Artists
Persian traditional Music
Orthodontist

Living people
Iranian caricaturists
Portrait artists
People from Tehran
Persian classical musicians
Year of birth missing (living people)
Iranian Yarsanis
Iranian Kurdish people